Management Learning is a peer-reviewed academic journal that publishes papers in the field of management five times per year. The journal's editors are Emma Bell (Keele University) and Todd Bridgman (Victoria University of Wellington). The journal was established in 1970 and is published by SAGE Publications.

Abstracting and indexing
The journal is abstracted and indexed in Scopus and the Social Sciences Citation Index. According to the Journal Citation Reports, its 2015 impact factor is 1.393, ranking it 90 out of 192 journals in the category "Management".

References

External links

SAGE Publishing academic journals
English-language journals
Publications established in 1970
Business and management journals
Education journals
5 times per year journals